Winford Abrams (January 20, 1868September 18, 1921) was an American public administrator and politician.  He was the 31st Mayor of Green Bay, Wisconsin.

Biography
Abrams was born on January 20, 1868. His father, W. J. Abrams, was also Mayor of Green Bay, as well as a member of the Wisconsin State Senate and Wisconsin State Assembly.

Career
Abrams was elected to the Green Bay City Council in 1902. In 1904, he was selected to be President of the City Council during the tenure of Mayor Robert E. Minahan. Abrams became Mayor in 1908 and served in that role until 1916. In 1918, he became Vice Mayor, serving under Elmer Hall. Hall resigned in January 1921 to take office as Secretary of State of Wisconsin, at which time Abrams once again became Green Bay's chief executive. He remained so until the election of Wenzel Wiesner in April.

Personal
Abrams married Ottilia Rhode. They had one daughter. Abrams died from complications due to problems with his heart and Bright's disease on September 18, 1921. He is buried in Allouez, Wisconsin.

References

Mayors of Green Bay, Wisconsin
Wisconsin city council members
1868 births
1921 deaths